Podgorci is a village west of Velika Nedelja in the Municipality of Ormož in northeastern Slovenia. The area traditionally belonged to the Styria region and is now included in the Drava Statistical Region.

The local parish church is built on a small hill above the settlement and is dedicated to Saint Leonard. It belongs to the Roman Catholic Archdiocese of Maribor. It was built in 1519 and was vaulted in the late 18th century.

References

External links

Podgorci on Geopedia
Tourist association of Podgorci

Populated places in the Municipality of Ormož